Jama Abdullahi Qalib (1930–2015) was a Somali politician who was a senior member of the Somali Youth League, and served as speaker of the Somali Parliament during the Somali Republic's early civilian administration between 1960 and 1964. He was also a Speaker of parliament 1979 – 1982.

Life and career
Qalib was born in Hargeisa, in northern Somalia, in 1930. He died in Lusaka, Zambia in 2015.

References

1930 births
2015 deaths
Somali Youth League politicians
Somalian politicians
Speakers of the Parliament of Somalia